= Box the Fox =

Folk tune of Appalachian origin

"Box the Fox" (sometimes just "Box Fox") is a tune of Appalachian origin, usually played on the fiddle or banjo. The name comes from the old Irish slang "to box the fox", meaning to steal apples or, in general, to rob an orchard.
